USS Osberg (DE-538) was a John C. Butler-class destroyer escort in service with the United States Navy from 1945 to 1947 and from 1951 to 1958. She sold for scrapping in 1974.

Namesake

Carl August Osberg was born on 13 April 1920 in Dunbarton, New Hampshire. He attended Manchester Central High School, where he played football. In his free time he observed bi-planes at Grenier Field, site of today's Manchester–Boston Regional Airport. He quit college at Cornell to join the Navy reserves and was trained at Naval Air Station Squantum in Massachusetts. He was one of the twelve pilots of Torpedo Squadron 3 attached to the aircraft carrier . During the Battle of Midway on 4 June 1942, his squadron attacked Imperial Japanese Navy ships and he went missing. He was posthumously awarded the Navy Cross.

History
Osberg was commissioned on 10 December 1945 and was decommissioned on 15 May 1947. She was recommissioned for duty during the Korean War on 26 February 1951. She operated in the Atlantic Ocean until her second decommissioning on 25 February 1958. She was struck from the Navy list on 1 August 1972, and, on 5 February 1974 she was sold for scrapping.

References

External links 

 NavSource Online: Destroyer Escort Photo Archive – USS Osberg (DE-538)

John C. Butler-class destroyer escorts
Ships built in Boston
1943 ships
World War II frigates and destroyer escorts of the United States